Le Palais Ducal or The Doge's Palace is the name given to various oil paintings which depict the Doge's Palace (in Italian, "Palazzo Ducale", translated to French as "Palais Ducal") made by Claude Monet during a visit to Venice in 1908.

Description
Monet painted the Doge's Palace from several viewpoints during his three month sojourn in Venice, from October to December 1908.  The title Le Palais Ducal generally refers to three similar paintings dominated by the palace itself, painted from a boat moored in the lagoon: one in the collection of Adele and Herbert J. Klapper in the US, a second in the Brooklyn Museum, and a third in a private collection of the Goeritz family in the UK from the 1920s until it was sold at Sotheby's in February 2019.  They are catalogued by Wildenstein as W1742 to W1744.

The Impressionist work is painted with dappled brushstrokes in a bright palette of pinks, yellows and blues, bathed in a warm light.  It is roughly divided into two horizontal zones.  The upper part depicts the pink and white diamond patterned stonework of the Venetian Gothic palace walls pierced by arched windows with colonnaded arcades on the lower two floors, the blue sky above, the Lion of Venice column in the Piazzetta di San Marco to the left, and Ponte della Paglia and the New Prison (Prigioni Nuove) building to the right.  The lower part is filled with the rippling waters of the Venetian lagoon and the reflection of the buildings.

Monet had intended to return to paint in Venice again, but the illness of his second wife Alice Hoschedé prevent him travelling.  He continued to work on many of his Venetian paintings when he returned home to Giverny, until they were shown in a critically acclaimed exhibition at Galerie Bernheim-Jeune in May 1912.  Paul Signac considered these paintings to be one of Monet's greatest achievements.

Versions
One version of Le Palais Ducal (W1742) was exhibited at the Galerie Bernheim-Jeune in Paris in 1912, and sold via the Galerie Durand-Ruel in 1917 to Pierre Dubeid in Neuchâtel, and then via Galerie Caspari in Munich to Max Emden in Berlin.  Emden, a Jewish department store owner, was persecuted by the Nazis in the 1930s, and some of his artworks were sold in unclear circumstances via Swiss dealers.  It seems the painting came into the private collection of Hermann Lütjens of Küsnacht near Zürich, and was later acquired by Erich Maria Remarque and held in his collection in Locarno by 1959.  It was sold by Remarque's widow Paulette Goddard in New York in 1979, and acquired by a dealer who sold to Adele and Herbert J. Klapper in 1980.  The painting measures , and is signed and dated "Claude Monet 1908".  The Klappers kept it in their private collection until at least 2011.  After the deaths of Herbert in 1999 and Adele in 2018, some works from their collection (but excluding this Monet) were auctioned at Christie's in New York in November 2018.

A second version in the Brooklyn Museum (W1743) measures . It was auctioned in New York in 1920, along with other works by Monet from the collection of the doctor Arthur Brewster Emmons.  It was bought by the American leather dealer and art collector Aaron Augustus Healy and donated to the Brooklyn Museum the same year, the year before his death.

A third version (W1744) was also exhibited at the Galerie Bernheim-Jeune in Paris in 1912.  It was consigned to Paul Cassirer in Berlin in 1914, and sold to Hans Wendland in 1918.  It was sold via Thannhauser Galleries to the German textile merchant and art collector  in 1926, and was held mainly in England after he emigrated in the 1930s.  It was loaned to Toronto Art Museum from 1946 until 1950, and after the death of Erich Goeritz in 1955 it was inherited by his son Thomas Goeritz.  Signed and dated "Claude Monet 1908", it measures .  This painting was sold by the descendants of the Goeritz family at Sotheby's in London in February 2019 for £27.5m, setting an auction record for one of Monet's Venetian paintings.  On the recommendation of the Reviewing Committee on the Export of Works of Art, an export licence has been temporarily withheld by the Department for Digital, Culture, Media and Sport to permit another buyer to match the price, to keep the painting in the UK.

Similar paintings by Monet
Monet painted two other views of the Doge's Palace in 1908.  One painting, The Doge's Palace Seen from San Giorgio Maggiore, of which six versions are known (W1751 to W1756), shows the more distant view from San Giorgio Maggiore, and a third shows a more oblique view from further east, one version of which also was owned by Wendland and Erich Goeritz, but sold to Jakob Goldschmidt in about 1928, confiscated by the Nazi regime, and recovered after the war by Erwin Goldschmidt, and sold at Sotheby's in 2015 for US$23m .

References
 The Doge's Palace (Le Palais ducal), Brooklyn Museum
 Claude Monet view of the Doge’s Palace in Venice sells for £24m at Sotheby’s, 26 February 2019 
 Claude Monet’s Enchanting Vision of Venice to Appear at Auction for the First Time, Sotheby's, 21 December 2018 
 Claude Monet, Le Palais Ducal, Sotheby's, 26 February 2019, W1744
 Adelphi to exhibit works by Monet from the Adele and Herbert J. Klapper Collection, Adelphi University, April 11, 2011
 ‘A great collectors’ partnership’: The Collection of Herbert and Adele Klapper, Christie's, 2018
 Monet's £28m masterpiece blocked from leaving UK by government, BBC News, 9 August 2019
 Spellbinding Monet work worth £28 million at risk of being lost, gov.uk, 9 August 2019
 Remarque and his art collection: ‘In order that each day may be filled to the brim with beauty’
 Paulette Goddard Art Collection Is Auctioned for $3.1 Million, New York Times, November 8, 1979
 Claude Monet (1840-1926): A Tribute to Daniel Wildenstein and Katia Granoff, p.326
 Claude Monet, Le Palais Ducal, Sotheby's, 5 May 2015, W1770

Paintings of Venice by Claude Monet
1908 paintings
Water in art
Paintings of Venice